Richie Graham of Brackenhill (1555-1606) was a prominent Reiver active in late sixteenth century Great Britain.

Richie was the son of Fergus Graham of Mote in Lydysdale, Cumberland. Fergus Graham of Mote acquired Brackenhill in Arthuret after 1561. He purchased it from Sir Thomas Dacre. He settled the property on to his third son, Richard or Richie in the 1580s.

Richie Graham built Brackenhill Tower in 1584 .

On 27 June 1592 he joined the forces of the rebel Francis Stewart, 5th Earl of Bothwell and surrounded and besieged Falkland Palace in Fife while James VI and Anne of Denmark were in residence. Graham and his companions, including Thomas Musgrave, captain of Bewcastle, sacked the town of Falkland and stole 80 horses and clothes and money from the townspeople. After the Raid of Falkland he sheltered the Scottish rebel James Douglas of Spott at Brackenhill.

He aided Lord Buccleuch in springing Kinmont Willie from Carlisle Castle in 1596.

He died in 1606.

Richie Graham can be confused with a contemporary Scottish Richie Graham, who was involved in the North Berwick Witch Trials.

References

1555 births
1606 deaths
Border Reivers
16th-century English people
People of Falkland Palace